WMAY (970 kHz) is a commercial AM radio station in Springfield, Illinois.  The station is owned by Mid-West Family Broadcasting and the license is held by Long Nine, Inc.  WMAY's transmitter, radio studios and offices are all located on North Third Street in Riverton, Illinois.

WMAY is powered at 1,000 watts by day and 500 watts at night. Programming is simulcast on two FM translators: W234CC at 94.7 MHz in Sherman, Illinois, and 102.5 W273DR in Springfield.

Previous news/talk programming
Weekdays on WMAY-AM-FM began with "The WMAY Newsfeed," a local news and information show hosted by Greg Bishop.  Local talk shows were heard in late mornings with Mike Wennmacher and in afternoon drive time with Jim Leach.  The syndicated "Ramsey Show with Dave Ramsey" is carried in early afternoons.  Evenings and overnights feature "Hits and Headlines," a mix of classic hits and news updates from ABC News Radio and the WMAY newsroom.

Weekends featured programs on money, health, law, real estate, computers, guns and an hour devoted to the music of the Grateful Dead.  Some weekend shows are paid brokered programming.  The rest of the weekend is "Hits and Headlines."

History
It was owned by Lincoln Broadcasting. In 1963, the station was acquired by Springfield Broadcasting, a division of Stuart Stations. It aired a full service middle of the road music format, using NBC Radio News for its world and national news coverage.

Mid-West Family Broadcasting bought the station in 1976, switching it to country music a short time later.  In the early 1990s, WMAY went with an oldies format, and it flipped to its current talk radio format in 1995.  Mid-West Family Broadcasting also owns local stations 98.7 WNNS-FM, 97.7 WQLZ and 92.7 WMAY-FM.
Three of the most well-known broadcasters to pass through the studio were Bob Hale (hired directly from Clear Lake, IA after the Buddy Holly plane crash in 1959. He mc'd the show at the Surf Ballroom that night, gave casualties the next day, and was hired by WMAY; he purportedly made the coin flip between Ritchie Valens and Tommy Allsup for the final seat on the plane.); Cal Schrum ("The State Policeman's Friend," on the overnight shift; starred in several B westerns and was beloved by law enforcement personnel working the "graveyard shift"); and Red Barnes (Gregory Harutunian), his 1980s successor who would "set the chickens free," in the early morning hours. The station was also known in the 1980s for its “Little Black Box” promotion that awarded keys to a new vehicle to the finder of a hidden box containing keys to a new vehicle. The station would air clues for listeners to scavenger hunt the surrounding metro area for the “black box”. The promotion ended around the time the station switched from its long-running Country format.

On August 28, 2020, it was announced by Midwest Family that WUSW (now WMAY-FM) would drop their country format and begin simulcasting WMAY on September 1. The addition of 92.7 expands WMAY's FM coverage to areas to the south and east of Springfield.

On April 25, 2022, WMAY changed its format from news/talk (which continues on WMAY-FM 92.7 Taylorville) to classic hits, branded as "102.5 The Lake".

References

External links
FCC History Cards for WMAY

MAY
Classic hits radio stations in the United States
Radio stations established in 1995